The Augusta Sledge House, also known as the Morrisette-Tunstall-Sledge House, was a historic plantation house and historic district near Newbern, Alabama, USA.  The main house was built in 1855 and is an example of the cottage orné style, which was at the height of its popularity in the mid-19th century. The property is included in the Plantation Houses of the Alabama Canebrake and Their Associated Outbuildings Multiple Property Submission. It was added to the National Register of Historic Places on July 7, 1994, due to its architectural and historical significance.  It was razed circa 2010.

References

National Register of Historic Places in Hale County, Alabama
Historic districts in Hale County, Alabama
Houses on the National Register of Historic Places in Alabama
Houses completed in 1855
Plantation houses in Alabama
Demolished buildings and structures in Alabama
Houses in Hale County, Alabama
Historic districts on the National Register of Historic Places in Alabama
Buildings and structures demolished in 2010